South Indian International Movie Awards, also known as the SIIMA Awards, rewards the artistic and technical achievements of the South Indian film industry. SIIMA Awards are presented for numerous categories in each of the four language films(Kannada, Malayalam, Tamil & Telugu). SIIMA award for Best Actor recognizes the performance of an actor in a leading role in South Indian movie. SIIMA award for Best Actor was first given during the year 2012.

Superlatives

Winners & Nominees

Critics choice

References

South Indian International Movie Awards